The Miss Texas competition was founded in 1937 as a scholarship contest for young women. The winner represents Texas in the Miss America pageant; three winners have gone on to be crowned Miss America (but none since 1975).

To become Miss Texas, a contestant must first win a local competition. A young woman may compete at the local and state level more than once, but may only compete in the national Miss America competition one time. Hundreds of women participate each year in the local pageants, culminating in the selection of local finalists who compete for the Miss Texas title each July. The state pageant was held in Fort Worth for 36 years before relocating to the University of Texas at Arlington's Texas Hall in 2009. In 2012, the pageant moved to the Allen Event Center in suburban Collin County. In 2014 the Miss Texas pageant began being held at the Eisemann Center for Performing Arts in Richardson, Texas.

In 2010, Miss Texas celebrated its 75th anniversary, and Randy Pruett wrote a book, A Dream as Big as Texas, to document the stories of the 75 women that were crowned Miss Texas.

Averie Bishop of Dallas was crowned Miss Texas 2022 on June 25, 2022 at Eisemann Center in Richardson, Texas. She competed for the title of Miss America 2023 at the Mohegan Sun in Uncasville, Connecticut in December 2022 where she placed 2nd runner-up along with winning the Women in Business and Women Who Brand awards along with being an Equity & Justice Finalist.

Gallery of past titleholders

Results summary 
The following is a visual summary of the past results of Miss Texas titleholders at the national Miss America pageants/competitions. The year in parentheses indicates the year of the national competition during which a placement and/or award was garnered, not the year attached to the contestant's state title.

Placements 
 Miss Americas: Jo-Carroll Dennison (1942), Phyllis George (1971), Shirley Cothran (1975)
 1st runners-up: Moselle Ransome (1927), Alice Emerick (1937), Shilah Phillips (2007)
 2nd runners-up: Penny Lee Rudd (1963), Carmen McCollum (1977), Jonna Fitzgerald (1986), Averie Bishop (2022)
 3rd runners-up: Linda Loftis (1962), Sharon McCauley (1965), Mae Beth Cormany (1973), Suzanne Lawrence (1991)
 4th runners-up: Sheri Ryman (1982), Tamara Hext (1985), Yanci Yarbrough (2000), Margana Wood (2018)
 Top 7: Caroline Carothers (2017)
 Top 8: Molly Hazlett (2008)
 Top 10: Mary Nell Hendricks (1959), Susan Logan (1967), Judy Mallett (1974), Mary Ellen Richardson (1976), Lori Smith (1978), Sandi Miller (1979), Terri Eoff (1981), Dana Rogers (1984), Stephany Samone (1987), Rita Jo Thompson (1988), Leah Kay Lyle (1990), Rhonda Morrison (1992), Arian Archer (1995), Michelle Martinez (1997), Tara Watson (2001), Mary Lisa Dalzell (2003), Jamie Story (2005), Morgan Matlock (2006), Kristen Blair (2010), Kendall Morris (2012), DaNae Couch (2013), Ivana Hall (2014), Shannon Sanderford (2016), Mallory Fuller (2022)
 Top 12: Ashley Melnick (2011)
 Top 13: Polly Below (1945)
 Top 15: Rosebud Blondell (1926), Patricia Allen Green (1936), Charmayne Smith (1939), Chandler Foreman (2019/2020)
 Top 16: Margaret Sommers (1951), Monique Evans (2015)
 Top 20: Stacy James (2002)

Awards

Preliminary awards
 Preliminary Interview: Mary Lisa Dalzell (2003)
 Preliminary Lifestyle and Fitness: Jo-Carroll Dennison (1942), Phyllis George (1971), Shirley Cothran (1975), Carmen McCollum (1977), Tamara Hext (1985), Molly Hazlett (2008), Kendall Morris (2012), Margana Wood (2018)
Preliminary Social Impact Pitch: Mallory Fuller (2022)
 Preliminary Talent: Jo-Carroll Dennison (1942), Linda Loftis (1962), Carmen McCollum (1977), Sheri Ryman (1982), Jonna Fitzgerald (1986), Stephany Samone (1987), Suzanne Lawrence (1991), Shilah Phillips (2007)

Non-finalist awards
 Non-finalist Interview: BaShara Chandler (1994)
 Non-finalist Talent: Marilyn Turner (1960), Mary Cage Moore (1961), Gloria Gilbert (1983), Sunni Cranfill (2004), Madison Fuller (2019)

Other awards
 Equity & Justice Finalists: Averie Bishop (2023)
 Miss Congeniality: Joyce Courrege (1944), Luna McClain (1947), Rebecca Robinson (2009)
 Louanne Gamba Instrumental Award: Kendall Morris (2012)
 Quality of Life Award Winners: Suzanne Lawrence (1991)
 Women in Business Winners: Averie Bishop (2023)
 Women Who Brand Winners: Averie Bishop (2023)

Winners

In popular culture
 In the long-running television series Dallas, the character Sue Ellen Ewing had purportedly won the title of Miss Texas in 1967, long before the events of the show took place (1978–91).

 The song "Almost" by the band Bowling for Soup features the line, "I almost dropped out of school at fourteen where I almost made out with the Homecoming Queen, who almost went on to be Miss Texas, but lost to a slut with much bigger breasts."

References

External links
 Miss Texas official website

Texas
Texas culture
Recurring events established in 1936
1936 establishments in Texas
Women in Texas
Annual events in Texas